Pantorhytes quadripustulatus is a species of true weevil family. This species occurs in Papua New Guinea.

References 

 Encyclopaedia of Life
 Global Species
 Myers, P., R. Espinosa, C. S. Parr, T. Jones, G. S. Hammond, and T. A. Dewey. 2013.  The Animal Diversity Web (online) 
 Archiv für Naturgeschichte 1906, page 271
 Papua Insects
 The Genus Pantorhytes

Entiminae
Beetles described in 1875